Clarinda is a city in and the county seat of Page County, Iowa. It is located in Nodaway Township. The population was 5,369 at the time of the 2020 census.

History
Clarinda was founded in 1851, and incorporated on December 8, 1866. Many stories are told of such notables as Jesse James frequently passing through.

The town is named for Clarinda Buck, who according to legend carried water to the surveyors while Page County was first being surveyed.

The best known national firm in Clarinda for many decades was Berry's Seed Company, a mail order farm seed distribution business founded in 1885 at Clarinda by A. A. Berry. Berry's Seed Company diversified into retail stores in the 1950s, but the stores were sold off over the following decade, and today the company, known as Berry's Garden Center, operates from its one remaining retail outlet in Danville, Illinois.

In 1943, during World War II, an internment camp designed for 3,000 prisoners of war with sixty barracks and a 150-bed hospital was built in Clarinda. German prisoners were the first to arrive at Camp Clarinda, followed in 1945 by Italian and Japanese POWs.

The southeast area of Clarinda was once dubbed "Gun Town" and remains known by that name today. A noted author wrote, "In the twenties and thirties, Clarinda seemed to be two separate towns: Guntown and Uptown. In the middle of the square was, and remains, the courthouse. The four blocks surrounding the square are filled with businesses. Guntown was a town all its own. The 700 block of East Garfield was a solid block of businesses--grocery stores, barber, a Chinese restaurant, another restaurant on a corner, a rug factory, a large grocery, the Swifts packing plant, and railroad tracks with freight depot and roundhouse to turn trains around."

Transportation
Road Network

Clarinda is located on US Highway 71 and Iowa Highway 2. In the past, both of these highways came through the center of town, but there is now a bypass that takes both highways to the south and east of Clarinda proper. There is also a good network of “farm to market” or county roads servicing the area.

Railroad Service

Early in its history, Clarinda was served by railroads from seven different directions - 5 of which were predecessors to the Chicago, Burlington, and Quincy Railroad (CB&Q). The short westbound leg of track connecting Clarinda to Shenandoah was torn up in 1936 due to a washout of the track. In 1946, service was lost on the eastbound leg to Humeston and the line southwest to Tarkio, Missouri, through Coin, Iowa. Service was maintained south of Clarinda until the 1950s and was then trimmed back to a branch serving Clarinda from the main line to the north at Villisca, Iowa. This line survived a merger into the Burlington Northern but was abandoned in the 1980s. The beautiful brick depot in Clarinda still survives and is now the Student Union of Southwest Iowa Community College.

There were two additional shortline railroads that ran to Clarinda. One was the Iowa & Southwestern which connected Clarinda southwest through College Springs to the Iowa-Missouri border town of Blanchard. The I&SW had its own depot very close to the Clarinda CB&Q Depot. It was abandoned before 1914. The second route was the Clarinda and St. Louis Railroad which ran south out of Clarinda roughly paralleling the CB&Q line to the east and terminating in Rosenberry, Missouri. This line joined with the Wabash Railroad just a few miles east of the CB&Q line also from Clarinda interchanged with the Wabash in the town of Burlington Junction, Missouri. The Clarinda and St. Louis Railroad was abandoned in the 1899 after only a few years of operation.

Clarinda now joins a growing list of county seats in Iowa without rail service.[12]

Air Service

Camp Clarinda was located by what today is the town's municipal airport, Schenck Field (named for aviator/farmer Ray Schenck, who built the original Clarinda Airport on the location).

Geography
Clarinda is located at  (40.737599, -95.035928) along the West Nodaway River, just north of its confluence with the East Nodaway River.

Climate

Demographics

2010 census
As of the census of 2010, there were 5,572 people, 1,928 households, and 1,153 families residing in the city. The racial makeup of the city was 89.2% White, 5.6% African American, 1.1% Native American, 1.5% Asian, 0.1% Pacific Islander, 0.8% from other races, and 1.7% from two or more races. Hispanic or Latino of any race were 3.2% of the population.

There were 1,928 households, of which 26.1% had children under the age of 18 living with them, 45.3% were married couples living together, 10.2% had a female householder with no husband present, 4.4% had a male householder with no wife present, and 40.2% were non-families. 35.3% of all households were made up of individuals, and 18% had someone living alone who was 65 years of age or older. The average household size was 2.19 and the average family size was 2.80.

The median age in the city was 40 years. 21.1% of residents were under the age of 18; 8.9% were between the ages of 18 and 24; 26.4% were from 25 to 44; 25.6% were from 45 to 64; and 18% were 65 years of age or older. The gender makeup of the city was 57.6% male and 42.4% female.

2000 census
As of the census of 2000, there were 5,690 people, 2,017 households, and 1,246 families residing in the city. The racial makeup of the city was 92.02% White, 4.62% African American, 0.65% Native American, 1.09% Asian, 0.04% Pacific Islander, 0.51% from other races, and 1.07% from two or more races. Hispanic or Latino of any race were 1.41% of the population.

There were 2,017 households, out of which 27.5% had children under the age of 18 living with them, 49.4% were married couples living together, 9.8% had a female householder with no husband present, and 38.2% were non-families. 34.7% of all households were made up of individuals, and 18.0% had someone living alone who was 65 years of age or older. The average household size was 2.21 and the average family size was 2.83.

Age spread: 22.1% under the age of 18, 9.3% from 18 to 24, 29.8% from 25 to 44, 19.5% from 45 to 64, and 19.3% who were 65 years of age or older. The median age was 38 years. For every 100 females, there were 121.7 males. For every 100 females age 18 and over, there were 122.2 males.

The median income for a household in the city was $35,871, and the median income for a family was $43,654. Males had a median income of $35,061 versus $23,635 for females. The per capita income for the city was $15,136. About 9.9% of families and 16.3% of the population were below the poverty line, including 18.2% of those under age 18 and 6.6% of those age 65 or over.

Economy
NSK-AKS (a subsidiary of the Japanese corporation NSK Ltd.) operates a manufacturing plant in Clarinda that produces ball and roller bearings.

Lisle Corporation, which makes hand tools and garage creepers for auto mechanics, was founded in Clarinda in 1903.

A large mental health center, the Clarinda Treatment Complex, is located on the north edge of the city. It was established in 1884 as the third mental asylum in the state of Iowa. Mental health professionals treated sex offenders, the mentally ill, alcoholics, drug addicts, and the criminally insane until its closing in 2015.

Sports
Clarinda is the home of the Clarinda A's, a summer amateur baseball team. The team won the 1981 National Baseball Congress championship. It has sent several players on to the major leagues, notably Baseball Hall of Fame member Ozzie Smith, who regularly returns to Clarinda for special events. Previously, Clarinda was home to minor league baseball. The 1910-1911 Clarinda Antelopes played as members of the Class D level Missouri-Iowa-Nebraska-Kansas League.

Iowa Western Community College fielded Nationally Ranked junior college baseball teams from 1982 through 1984. Compiling a record of 119 wins and 26 losses during that time, the IWCC Bluejays were nationally ranked as high as 9th in the nation in 1982, ranked 4th in 1983 and the 1984 team was ranked 6th nationally and went to the National Junior College World Series in Grand Junction, Colorado. Coach Jeff DuPre's teams had a total of 10 players drafted during the three-year span and had players continue their college careers at schools such has Arizona State, Nebraska, Illinois, South Alabama, Jacksonville, Louisiana Tech, Grand Canyon State and South Carolina/Aiken. The 1982 to 1984 span also produced 6 All-American players, with George Gonzalez being First Team All American in 1982. The 1982 team set a Junior College record at the time with a .390 batting average. When the IWCC Bluejays went to the 1984 NJCAA World Series they were the smallest school ever to qualify.

Arts and culture

Clarinda Picture Gallery

Education
The Clarinda Community School District serves the municipality.

Clarinda is also home to a campus of Iowa Western Community College

Infrastructure

Health care
In 1884, the citizens rallied to build the third mental hospital in the state of Iowa. For over 100 years, the Clarinda State Hospital, known as the Clarinda Treatment Complex, was located on the north end of the city. On June 30, 2015, the hospital facility was shut down and all patient services terminated. The Clarinda Academy, a juvenile detention facility owned by Sequel Youth Services, was the sole occupant of the former hospital grounds until its closure in 2021. 

In 1939, the Clarinda Municipal Hospital was created. In 1997, Clarinda Municipal Hospital's name was changed by its Board of Trustees to Clarinda Regional Health Center. In January 2012, the Clarinda Regional Health Center (CRHC) moved into a new replacement hospital and clinic facility on the south edge of Clarinda. CRHC is a municipal, non-profit, Critical Access Hospital licensed for 25 in-patient beds.

State prison
Clarinda also holds a state prison called the Clarinda Correctional Facility.

Transportation
Daily intercity bus service to Clarinda is provided by Jefferson Lines. The bus stop serves buses between Sioux Falls and Kansas City.

Notable people

Vernon Baker, one of seven African-American World War II Medal of Honor recipients
Edwin Harris Colbert, paleontologist
William Peters Hepburn, U.S. representative
Norman Maclean, author of A River Runs Through It
Marilyn Maxwell, singer and film actress
Glenn Miller, 1940s big band leader
Jessie Field Shambaugh, founder of 4-H

References

External links

City of Clarinda, Iowa Website Portal style website, Government, Business, Library, Recreation and more
Clarinda Chamber of Commerce
Clarinda Economic Development Corporation

 
Cities in Iowa
Cities in Page County, Iowa
County seats in Iowa